The 1978–79 Boston Bruins season was the Bruins' 55th season. The Bruins captured their fourth straight division title but were defeated in the postseason in heartbreaking fashion in seven games to their hated rivals, the Montreal Canadiens, and denied an opportunity to play for the Stanley Cup. Don Cherry was subsequently let go as head coach following this defeat.

Offseason

NHL Draft

Regular season
 Al Secord made his NHL debut with the Bruins during the 1978–79 season.

Season standings

Schedule and results

Player statistics

Regular season
Scoring

Goaltending

Playoffs
Scoring

Goaltending

Playoffs

Quarter-finals
Pittsburgh Penguins vs. Boston Bruins

Boston wins best-of-seven series 4 games to 0

Semi-finals
Boston Bruins vs. Montreal Canadiens

Game seven of the Montreal-Boston Semi-final is probably one of the most memorable in the history of the NHL. About a minute and a half after Boston's Rick Middleton scored with four minutes remaining in the third period to give the Bruins a 4–3 lead, linesman John D'Amico called a bench minor for too many men on the ice against the Bruins. Montreal's Guy Lafleur scored on the ensuing powerplay, sending the game to overtime where Yvon Lambert gave the Canadiens the win and a trip to their fourth straight Stanley Cup final.

Montreal wins best-of-seven series 4 games to 3

 The 1979 NHL Playoffs would mark the end of Don Cherry's tenure with the Bruins. Cherry, who had an uneasy relationship with Bruins General Manager Harry Sinden, was fired by the Bruins after a critical coaching mistake during a 1979 semi-final playoff series against the Canadiens. Up by a goal with less than two minutes left in the seventh game, the Bruins were penalized for having too many men on the ice. The Canadiens' Guy Lafleur scored the tying goal on the subsequent powerplay and ultimately won the game in overtime. Montreal went on to defeat the New York Rangers for their fourth straight Cup title.

References
 Bruins on Hockey Database

Boston Bruins seasons
Boston Bruins
Boston Bruins
Adams Division champion seasons
Boston Bruins
Boston Bruins
Bruins
Bruins